Petrov (masculine) or Petrova (feminine) is the name of several rural localities in Russia:
Petrov, Republic of Adygea, a khutor in Teuchezhsky District of the Republic of Adygea
Petrov, Belgorod Oblast, a khutor in Krasnogvardeysky District of Belgorod Oblast
Petrov, Saratov Oblast, a khutor in Tatishchevsky District of Saratov Oblast
Petrova, Bryansk Oblast, a selo in Karachevsky District of Bryansk Oblast
Petrova, Perm Krai, a village in Ilyinsky District of Perm Krai
Petrova, Tyumen Oblast, a village in Vikulovsky District of Tyumen Oblast